Oschersleben (Bode) station is a railway station in the town of Oschersleben (Bode), Saxony-Anhalt, Germany. The station lies on the Magdeburg–Thale railway.

Oschersleben station is the most important station on the line to Halberstadt. It was built together with the construction of the line to Brunswick. The southern side of the V-shaped station serves trains to Halberstadt and the northern side formerly served trains to Jerxheim and Brunswick and the trains of the Oschersleben-Schöningen Railway Company. The station building is located between the tracks and originally contained the customs and passport control facilities for travelling between the Duchy of Brunswick and the Kingdom of Prussia. After the division of Germany after 1945, the route to Jerxheim was closed and in consequence the northern side of the station lost most of its purpose. Until 1991, a few daily passenger trains shuttled from there to the border town of Gunsleben. In recent years a few trains from Magdeburg terminated on the north side of the station. Meanwhile, the tracks and the large reception hall on the north side are virtually unused.

Rail services
In the 2016 timetable, Oschersleben (Bode) station was served by the following services:

References

Railway stations in Saxony-Anhalt
Railway stations in Germany opened in 1843
1843 establishments in Prussia
Buildings and structures in Börde (district)